Armando Segundo Tobar Vargas (7 June 1938 – 18 November 2016) was a Chilean football forward who played for Chile in the 1962 and 1966 FIFA World Cups. He also played for Club Deportivo Universidad Católica. He died after respiratory failure in 2016.

References

External links
FIFA profile

1938 births
2016 deaths
Chilean footballers
Chile international footballers
Association football forwards
Club Deportivo Universidad Católica footballers
1962 FIFA World Cup players
1966 FIFA World Cup players
Huachipato managers
Audax Italiano managers